Peter Nicholson Duckett White, MC (19 January 1936 – 13 February 2005) was an Australian Army officer and politician. Born in Brisbane, he was educated at the Royal Military College, Duntroon and the Australian National University in Canberra. He served in the Australian Army from 1954 to 1975, during which time he deployed to Malaya and Vietnam, was awarded the Military Cross, and rose to the rank of lieutenant colonel. In 1977, he was elected to the Legislative Assembly of Queensland as the Liberal member for Southport. He held that position until 1980, when he was defeated by National Party candidate, Doug Jennings.

White then entered federal politics, winning the by-election for the Australian House of Representatives seat of McPherson caused by the death of Liberal minister Eric Robinson. Although challenged by former senator Glen Sheil of the National Country Party, he won the seat safely. He held the seat until his retirement in 1990. White died in 2005.

References

Royal Military College, Duntroon graduates
Liberal Party of Australia members of the Parliament of Queensland
Members of the Australian House of Representatives for McPherson
Members of the Australian House of Representatives
People from Brisbane
Members of the Queensland Legislative Assembly
1936 births
2005 deaths
20th-century Australian politicians